Halococcus dombrowskii is an archaeon first isolated from a Permian alpine salt deposit. It is an extremely halophilic coccoid with type strain H4T (= DSM 14522T = NCIMB 13803T = ATCC BAA-364T).

References

Further reading

External links

LPSN
Type strain of Halococcus dombrowskii at BacDive -  the Bacterial Diversity Metadatabase

Euryarchaeota
Archaea described in 2002